The February 2016 Lice bombing occurred on 18 February 2016 in Lice, a city in Diyarbakır Province, Turkey. The bombing consisted of a roadside bomb that killed 6 soldiers and injured another.

The Kurdish HPG forces claimed responsibility for the attack.

See also
March 2016 Diyarbakır bombing
2008 Diyarbakır bombing
2015 Diyarbakır rally bombing
February 2016 Ankara bombing, which occurred the day before

References

Mass murder in 2016
Kurdish–Turkish conflict (2015–present)
Terrorist incidents in Turkey in 2016
February 2016 crimes in Asia
Kurdistan Workers' Party attacks
Terrorist incidents in Diyarbakır Province
February 2016 events in Turkey
21st-century mass murder in Turkey